Stay Tuned may refer to:

Film and television
 Stay Tuned (film), a 1992 American film directed by Peter Hyams
 Stay Tuned (TV series), a Canadian comedy television series
 "Stay Tuned" (The Avengers), an episode of The Avengers 1960s TV series
 Stay Tuned!, a 2019 Japanese drama series based on a manga by Noriko Sasaki distributed globally by Netflix.
 Stay Tuned, a daily NBC News program distributed through Snapchat since 2017. It is hosted by Gadi Schwartz and Savannah Sellers.

Music
 Stay Tuned (Sharon, Lois & Bram album), 1987
 Stay Tuned (Chet Atkins album), 1985
 Stay Tuned, a 2000 album by Let's Go Bowling
 Stay Tuned, a 2007 album by Mark Radice
 "Stay Tuned", a song by Glay
 "Stay Tuned", a track on 1992 album Daily Operation by Gang Starr
 "Stay Tuned", a track on 2005 The Find (Ohmega Watts album)
 "Stay Tuned", a track on 2007 album Comicopera by Robert Wyatt
 "Stay Tuned", a track on 2009 album Evolution of a Man by Brian McKnight
 "Stay Tuned", a track on 2001 album Smiling & Waving by Anja Garbarek
 "Stay Tuned", a track on 2013 album Last Patrol by Monster Magnet
 "Stay Tuned", 2009 single by Exile (producer)

See also
 Nancy Drew: Stay Tuned for Danger, PC game
Extraña invasión, or Stay Tuned for Terror, a 1965 film  
...Or Stay Tuned, 2003 album by the People Under the Stairs